SC Ne Drehu is a football club of New Caledonia, competing in the New Caledonia Super Ligue. Its colors are orange and white.

Stadium

The current the club stadium is the Stade de Hnassé, in the city of Wé, with a capacity for 1680 spectators.

Squad
Updated June 2022.

References

Football clubs in New Caledonia